Harding is an unincorporated community in Harding County, in the U.S. state of South Dakota.

History
A post office called Harding was established in 1896, and remained in operation until 1961. The community took its name from Harding County.

References

Unincorporated communities in Harding County, South Dakota
Unincorporated communities in South Dakota